The Georgian ambassador in Paris is the official representative of the Government in Tbilisi to the Government of France. He is regularly accredited to the government in Monaco and at the UNESCO.

List of representatives

References 

Ambassadors of Georgia (country) to France
France
Georgia